Novotroitskoye is a rural locality (a village) in Dedovsky Selsoviet, Fyodorovsky District, Bashkortostan, Russia. The population was 37 as of 2010. There is 1 street.

Geography 
Novotroitskoye is located 21 km southwest of Fyodorovka (the district's administrative centre) by road. Ilyinovka is the nearest rural locality.

References 

Rural localities in Fyodorovsky District